Woodville Gardens School is a coeducational Birth–7 school (up to 13 years of age) located in the north-western Adelaide suburb of Woodville Gardens. The school is located at 18 Ridley Grove and occupies the land between Hanson Road and Murchison Street. It was established in 2011 by a merger between four schools in the area including Ridley Grove Primary School, on whose old site it was established. As at 2018, the enrolment was about 561 students.

References

External links
 

Primary schools in South Australia
Public schools in South Australia